Stanley George Feldman (born March 9, 1933) is an American lawyer and jurist who served as a member of the Arizona Supreme Court for twenty years from 1982 to 2002. He served as chief justice from 1992 to 1997.

Feldman was born in New York City and grew up in Tucson. He took his law degree at the University of Arizona.  Feldman was President of the State Bar of Arizona in 1974.

Feldman was the second Arizona Supreme Court Justice to be appointed under Arizona's then-new merit-selection system. Over two decades, Feldman wrote over 400 majority opinions, "displaying an exceptional ability to forge consensus among his colleagues." Feldman was widely considered a liberal.

References

1933 births
Living people
Place of birth missing (living people)
20th-century American lawyers
21st-century American judges
Arizona Democrats
Chief Justices of the Arizona Supreme Court
James E. Rogers College of Law alumni
Justices of the Arizona Supreme Court
Lawyers from New York City
Lawyers from Tucson, Arizona
University of Arizona alumni